The 2016 Mecklenburg-Vorpommern state election was held on 4 September 2016 to elect the members of the 7th Landtag of Mecklenburg-Vorpommern. The incumbent grand coalition between the Social Democratic Party (SPD) and Christian Democratic Union (CDU) led by Minister-President Erwin Sellering retained its majority and continued in office.

Campaign and issues
The governing grand coalition between the SPD and CDU was campaigning to defend its majority. Furthermore, the result of the right wing AfD party was eagerly awaited. During the campaign, its frontrunner, Leif-Erik Holm, warned of the "spread of Islam". The party hoped to be the strongest political force after the elections.

Asked for the most important issues, Forschungsgruppe Wahlen/Politbarometer pollees ranked "unemployment" on first place (38%), followed by "refugees/asylum" (25%) and "school/education" (12%). Incumbent Erwin Sellering (64%) was far more popular as a candidate for Minister President than the CDU candidate Lorenz Caffier (18%). In an infratest dimap poll, however, 34% named "refugees/migration" as the top issue, followed by "social justice" (27%) and "labor and economy" (20%).

During the final days of the state election campaign, Chancellor Angela Merkel, who has her constituency for the federal elections in Mecklenburg-Vorpommern and spoke in support of CDU candidate Caffier, she hardened her tone against immigrants and spoke in favor of deporting more of them, using the word "Rückführung" (repatriation) instead of "Abschiebung" (deportation) – though deportations are difficult to realize amid laws and international relations to the immigrants' home countries. On 1 September, Merkel for the first time admitted mistakes in her refugee policies, but only such that had been made years ago in 2004/05. According to Die Zeit, some saw a turn in her policies of Willkommenskultur and presumed "angst" in the Chancellor's office.

But in general, during the Mecklenburg-Vorpommern campaign, Merkel defended her refugee policies and the dictum "Wir schaffen das" ("We'll manage it"), saying she would have done everything again as she did the previous year. CDU candidate Caffier demanded prohibition of the burqa – even if there are hardly any women wearing a burqa in Mecklenburg-Vorpommern –, more police officers and more development of the rural areas. At the same time, SPD Minister President and frontrunner Erwin Sellering distanced himself from Merkel's refugee policies and demanded more respect for the life-time achievements of the East German people. Sellering e.g. stated: "It must not be, that our people are suffering, because the refugees are there." On 2 September, Sellering said on the nationwide ZDF channel, Merkel was responsible for the popularity of the AfD in the state: "The people who can imagine to elect the AfD, are clearly concerned about the refugee policies of the chancellor."

Parties
The table below lists parties represented in the 6th Landtag of Mecklenburg-Vorpommern.

Opinion polling

Results
Final results showed the SPD with 30.6% of the vote, AfD in second with 20.8%, CDU in third with 19.0%, and Die Linke in fourth with 13.2%. These parties would all have representatives in the Landtag. The Greens, NPD and FDP, who had previously had representation, all scored below 5%, and so did not qualify for a seat in the Landtag. This left the SPD as the biggest party, but without a majority and opened the way to continuing a coalition with the CDU, or a new "Red-Red" coalition with Die Linke. The latter, however, would only have a majority of 2 seats in the Landtag, and would be commensurately less likely.

< 2011    2021 >
|-
|colspan=7 align=center| 
|-
! colspan="2" rowspan="2" style="text-align:left; background:#e9e9e9; width:400px;"|Party
!  style="background:#e9e9e9; text-align:center;" colspan="3"|Popular vote
!  style="background:#e9e9e9; text-align:center;" colspan="3"|Seats
|-
!  style="text-align:right; background:#e9e9e9; width:60px;"|Votes
!  style="text-align:right; background:#e9e9e9; width:40px;"|%
!  style="text-align:right; background:#e9e9e9; width:50px;"|+/–
!  style="text-align:right; background:#e9e9e9; width:30px;"|Seats
!  style="text-align:right; background:#e9e9e9; width:30px;"|+/–
|-
|  Sozialdemokratische Partei Deutschlands – SPD
| 246,395
| 30.6 
|  5.1 
| 26 
|  1
|-
|  Alternative für Deutschland – AfD
| 167,852
| 20.8 
| New
| 18 
| New
|-
|  Christlich Demokratische Union Deutschlands – CDU
| 153,115
| 19.0 
|  4.1 
| 16 
|  2
|-
|  Die Linke
| 106,256
| 13.2 
|  5.2 
| 11 
|  3
|-
|  Bündnis 90/Die Grünen
| 38,836
| 4.8 
|  3.9 
| – 
|  7
|-
|  Freie Demokratische Partei – FDP
| 24,521
| 3.0 
|  0.3 
| – 
| –
|-
|  Nationaldemokratische Partei Deutschlands – NPD
| 24,322
| 3.0 
|  3.0 
| – 
|  5
|-
|  Tierschutzpartei
| 9,674
| 1.2 
|  1.2 
| – 
| –
|-
|  Familien-Partei Deutschlands
| 6,799
| 0.9 
|  0.7 
| – 
| –
|-
| || align=left | Freier Horizont Freier Horizont
| 6,603
| 0.8 
|  0.8 
| – 
| –
|-
|  Partei für Arbeit, Rechtstaat, Tierschutz, Elitenförderung und basisdemokratische Initiative
| 5,051
| 0.6 
|  0.3 
| – 
| –
|-
|  Freie Wähler
| 4,740
| 0.6 
|  0.5 
| – 
| –
|-
|  Piratenpartei Deutschland
| 3,935
| 0.5 
|  1.4 
| – 
| –
|-
| style="background:;"| || align=left |Other parties
| 8,320
| 1.1 
|  1.1 
| – 
| –
|- style="background:#e9e9e9;"
| style="text-align:right;" colspan="2"| Valid votes
| 806,419
| 98.2%
|  1.9
| colspan="2" rowspan="2" style="color:#bab9b9;"|
|- style="background:#e9e9e9;"
| style="text-align:right;" colspan="2"| Invalid votes
| 15,162
| 1.8%
|  1.9
|- style="background:#e9e9e9;"
| style="text-align:right;" colspan="2"| Totals and voter turnout
| 821,581	
| 61.9% 
|  10.4
| 71
|  0
|- style="background:#bab9b9;"
| colspan="2" | Electorate
| 1,328,320
| 100.00
| —
| colspan=2|
|-
| colspan="11" style="text-align:left;"| Source:
|}

Aftermath
Minister President Sellering stated that he wanted to lead exploratory talks with both the CDU and The Left.

On 5 September, Chancellor Angela Merkel took part of the responsibility for the CDU result in the elections. "I am the party leader, I am the chancellor — you can't separate those in people's eyes, so I am of course responsible too" for the result, she stated at a press conference at the G20 summit in China. Again she defended her decisions regarding refugee policies, saying they were "right". She also noted that federal and refugee policies had "superimposed" "everything" during the election campaign. Merkel faced not only increasing criticism of the CSU party after the elections, also AfD leader Frauke Petry criticised Merkel: "This ignorance is exemplary," she said. "It is not just ignorance. What we see here is the continuing arrogance of power." Also critics within the CDU party commented on the result. Specialist for domestic affairs Wolfgang Bosbach called the election day a "historic date", because the AfD came in before the CDU and the CDU was only third political force in a German territorial state. He demanded an alteration of the refugee policies, but saw no alternative for Merkel as the chancellor. SPD chief Sigmar Gabriel accused Angela Merkel of "simply repeating 'we will manage it' without doing it as well." Green party chief Cem Özdemir said that the persistent dispute within the Grand Coalition in Berlin had been "grist to the mill" of the AfD. The Left chairman Bernd Riexinger criticised the CDU and SPD on the grounds that they had "embraced" the positions of the AfD during the election campaign.

References

2016 elections in Germany
2016
September 2016 events in Germany
2010s in Mecklenburg-Western Pomerania